Coronilla scorpioides, the yellow crownvetch, is a species of annual herb in the family Fabaceae. They have a self-supporting growth form and compound, broad leaves. Individuals can grow to 20 cm tall.

Sources

References 

scorpioides
Flora of Malta